The Greek Line, formally known as the General Steam Navigation Company of Greece, was a passenger ship line that operated from 1939 to 1975. The Greek Line was owned by the Ormos Shipping Company.

The Greek Line was founded in 1939 with the acquisition of the former SS Tuscania, renamed the Nea Hellas. It operated transatlantic voyages until Greece entered World War II, becoming a troopship for the Allies.

The line continued to operate transatlantic and other short-to-long distance voyages, but later began operating leisure cruises as the Jet Age replaced passenger ships as the means of transportation across the Atlantic Ocean.

In 1953, the Greek Line ordered the SS Olympia, the only ship operated by the line that wasn't a second-hand purchase. 

In December of 1963, Greek Line's cruise ship TSMS Lakonia caught fire and sank, killing 128 people.

The company ran into financial difficulties in the early 1970s. Bankruptcy followed in 1975 and the last two ships, SS Olympia and SS Queen Anna Maria, were sold. The Queen Anna Maria ultimately became the Carnivale, which was the second ship to sail for the newly-formed Carnival Cruise Lines, today one of the largest cruise lines in the world.

None of the Greek Line's former ships are still in operation. The last surviving ship, the Olympia, was retired and sold for scrap in spring 2009.

Ships operated by the Greek Line

References

External links
 Greek Line history

Shipping companies of Greece
Defunct cruise lines
Defunct shipping companies
Transport companies established in 1939
Transport companies disestablished in 1975
1975 disestablishments in Greece
Defunct transport companies of Greece
Greek companies established in 1939